Mleczko  is a Polish surname. Mleczko is the diminutive of the Polish word for "milk" – mleko – and in a transferred sense is used to describe any whitish, viscous liquid. People with the name include:
 Allison Mleczko (born 1975), American ice hockey player
 Andrzej Mleczko (born 1949), Polish illustrator
 Miłosz Mleczko (born 1999), Polish footballer
 Wiktoryn Konstanty Mleczko (…–1679), elder of Samogitia and colonel of the Lithuanian army

References

See also
 

Polish-language surnames

pl:Mleczko